The chlorarachniophytes are a small group of exclusively marine algae widely distributed in tropical and temperate waters. They are typically mixotrophic, ingesting bacteria and smaller protists as well as conducting photosynthesis. Normally they have the form of small amoebae, with branching cytoplasmic extensions that capture prey and connect the cells together, forming a net. They may also form flagellate zoospores, which characteristically have a single subapical flagellum that spirals backwards around the cell body, and walled coccoid cells.

The chloroplasts were presumably acquired by ingesting some green alga. They are surrounded by four membranes, the outermost of which is continuous with the endoplasmic reticulum, and contain a small nucleomorph between the middle two, which is a remnant of the alga's nucleus. This contains a small amount of DNA and divides without forming a mitotic spindle. The origin of the chloroplasts from green algae is supported by their pigmentation, which includes chlorophylls a and b, and by genetic similarities. The only other group of algae that contain nucleomorphs are the cryptomonads, but their chloroplasts seem to be derived from a red alga.

The chlorarachniophytes only include five genera, which show some variation in their life-cycles and may lack one or two of the stages described above.  Genetic studies place them among the Cercozoa, a diverse group of amoeboid and amoeboid-like protozoa.

The chlorarachniophytes were placed before in the order Rhizochloridales, class Xanthophyceae (e.g., Smith, 1938), as algae, or in order Rhizochloridea, class Xanthomonadina (e.g., Deflandre, 1956), as protozoa.

So far sexual reproduction has only been reported in two species; Chlorarachnion reptans and Cryptochlora perforans.

Phylogeny
Based on the work of  Hirakawa et al. 2011.

Taxonomy
 Class Chlorarachniophyceae Hibberd & Norris 1984 [Chlorarachnea Cavalier-Smith 1998; Chlorarachniophyta Hibberd & Norris 1984; Chlorarachnia Cavalier-Smith 1993]
 Order Minorisida Cavalier-Smith 2017
 Family Minorisidae Cavalier-Smith 2017
 Genus Minorisa Del Campo 2013
 Species Minorisa minuta Del Campo 2013
 Order Chlorarachniales Ishida & Hara 1996 [Chlorarachniida Hibberd & Norris 1984]
 Family Chlorarachniaceae (Pascher 1939) Ishida & Hara 1996
 Genus Amorphochlora Ishida, Yabuki & Ota 2011
 Species Amorphochlora amoebiformis (Ishida & Hara 1996) Ishida, Yabuki & Ota 2011 [Lotharella amoeboformis Ishida & Hara 1996]
 Genus Bigelowiella Moestrup 2001
 Species B. longifila Shuhei, Kunihiko & Kenichiro 2007
 Species B. natans Moestrup 2001
 Genus Chlorarachnion Geitler 1930
 Species Chlorarachnion reptans Geitler 1930
 Genus Cryptochlora Calderon-Saenz & Schnetter 1987
 Species Cryptochlora perforans Calderon-Saenz & Schnetter 1987
 Genus Gymnochlora Ishida, Nakayama & Hara 1996
 Species G. dimorpha Ota 2011
 Species G. stellata Ishida, Nakayama & Hara 1996
 Genus Lotharella Ishida & Hara 1996
 Species L. scrobicolata Ishida & Hara 
 Species L. polymorpha Dietz et al. 2003
 Species L. vacuolata Ota & Ishida 2005
 Species L. oceanica Ota 2009
 Species L. reticulosa Ohta 2012
 Species L. globosa (Ishida & Hara 1994) Ishida & Hara 1996 [Chlorarachnion globosum Ishida & Hara 1994]
 Genus Norrisiella Ota, Ueda & Ishida 2007
 Species Norrisiella sphaerica Ota, Ueda & Ishida 2007
 Genus Partenskyella Ota et al. 2009
 Species Partenskyella glossopodia Ota et al. 2009

References

External links 
AlgaeBase: Chlorarachniophyta
Systematic Biology: Chlorarachniophyta
Systematic Biology: Cercozoa
Tree of Life: Chlorarachniophyta

Filosa
Algal taxonomy